This is a list of women who have been elected as member of the Eighth Parliament of the Fourth Republic of Ghana. Within the 8th parliament, the National Democratic Congress and the New Patriotic Party both have 20 female members each making a total of 40 out 275 being females.

Lists

See also 

 List of MPs elected in the 2020 Ghanaian general election
 Joyce Bamford-Addo - first female speaker of parliament in West Africa
List of female members of the Seventh Parliament of the Fourth Republic of Ghana

References 

Lists of members of the Parliament of Ghana
Lists of women legislators
Women members of the Parliament of Ghana